A high-temperature gas-cooled reactor (HTGR), is a nuclear reactor that uses a graphite moderator with a once-through uranium fuel cycle. The reactor core can be either a "prismatic block" (reminiscent of a conventional reactor core) or a "pebble-bed" core. The high temperatures enable applications such as process heat or hydrogen production via the thermochemical sulfur–iodine cycle.

The HTR is the predecessor of the Very-high-temperature reactor (VHTR), one of the future Generation IV reactor-models, which initially would work with temperatures of 750 to 950 °C.

Overview 
The HTGR is a type of high-temperature reactor that conceptually can reach high outlet temperatures (up to 750 °C).

There are two main types of HTGRs: pebble bed reactors (PBR) and prismatic block reactors (PMR).The prismatic block reactor refers to a prismatic block core configuration, in which hexagonal graphite blocks are stacked to fit in a cylindrical pressure vessel. The pebble bed reactor (PBR) design consists of fuel in the form of pebbles, stacked together in a cylindrical pressure vessel, like a gum-ball machine. Both reactors may have the fuel stacked in an annulus region with a graphite center spire, depending on the design and desired reactor power.

History 
The HTGR design was first proposed by the staff of the Power Pile Division of the Clinton Laboratories (known now as Oak Ridge National Laboratory) in 1947. 
Professor Rudolf Schulten in Germany also played a role in development during the 1950s. Peter Fortescue, whilst at General Atomics, was leader of the team responsible for the initial development of the High temperature gas-cooled reactor (HTGR), as well as the Gas-cooled Fast Reactor (GCFR) system.

The Peach Bottom unit 1 reactor in the United States was the first HTGR to produce electricity, and did so very successfully, with operation from 1966 through 1974 as a technology demonstrator. Fort St. Vrain Generating Station was one example of this design that operated as an HTGR from 1979 to 1989. Though the reactor was beset by some problems which led to its decommissioning due to economic factors, it served as proof of the HTGR concept in the United States (though no new commercial HTGRs have been developed there since).

Experimental HTGRs have also existed in the United Kingdom (the Dragon reactor) and Germany (AVR reactor and THTR-300), and currently exist in Japan (the High-temperature engineering test reactor using prismatic fuel with 30 MWth of capacity) and China (the HTR-10, a pebble-bed design with 10 MWe of generation). Two full-scale pebble-bed HTGRs, the HTR-PM reactors,  each with 100 MW of electrical production capacity, have gone operational in China as of 2021.

Nuclear reactor design

Neutron moderator 
The neutron moderator is graphite, although whether the reactor core is configured in graphite prismatic blocks or in graphite pebbles depends on the HTGR design.

Nuclear fuel 
The fuel used in HTGRs is coated fuel particles, such as TRISO fuel particles. Coated fuel particles have fuel kernels, usually made of uranium dioxide, however, uranium carbide or uranium oxycarbide are also possibilities. Uranium oxycarbide combines uranium carbide with the uranium dioxide to reduce the oxygen stoichiometry. Less oxygen may lower the internal pressure in the TRISO particles caused by the formation of carbon monoxide, due to the oxidization of the porous carbon layer in the particle. The TRISO particles are either dispersed in a pebble for the pebble bed design or molded into compacts/rods that are then inserted into the hexagonal graphite blocks. The QUADRISO fuel concept conceived at Argonne National Laboratory has been used to better manage the excess of reactivity.

Coolant

Helium 
Helium has been the coolant used in most HTGRs to date, and the peak temperature and power depend on the reactor design. Helium is an inert gas, so it will generally not chemically react with any material. Additionally, exposing helium to neutron radiation does not make it radioactive, unlike most other possible coolants.

Molten salt 
The molten salt cooled variant, the LS-VHTR, similar to the advanced high-temperature reactor (AHTR) design, uses a liquid fluoride salt for cooling in a pebble core. It shares many features with a standard VHTR design, but uses molten salt as a coolant instead of helium. The pebble fuel floats in the salt, and thus pebbles are injected into the coolant flow to be carried to the bottom of the pebble bed, and are removed from the top of the bed for recirculation. The LS-VHTR has many attractive features, including: the ability to work at high temperatures (the boiling point of most molten salts being considered are > 1,400 °C), low-pressure operation, high power density, better electric conversion efficiency than a helium-cooled VHTR operating at similar conditions, passive safety systems, and better retention of fission products in case an accident occurred.

Control 
In the prismatic designs, control rods are inserted in holes cut in the graphite blocks that make up the core. The VHTR will be controlled like current PBMR designs if it utilizes a pebble bed core, the control rods will be inserted in the surrounding graphite reflector. Control can also be attained by adding pebbles containing neutron absorbers.

Materials challenges 
The high-temperature, high-neutron dose, and, if using a molten salt coolant, the corrosive environment, of the VHTR require materials that exceed the limitations of current nuclear reactors. In a study of Generation IV reactors in general (of which there are numerous designs, including the VHTR), Murty and Charit suggest that materials that have high dimensional stability, either with or without stress, maintain their tensile strength, ductility, creep resistance, etc. after aging, and are corrosion resistant are primary candidates for use in VHTRs. Some materials suggested include nickel-base superalloys, silicon carbide, specific grades of graphite, high-chromium steels, and refractory alloys. Further research is being conducted at US national laboratories as to which specific issues must be addressed in the Generation IV VHTR prior to construction.

Safety features and other benefits 
The design takes advantage of the inherent safety characteristics of a helium-cooled, graphite-moderated core with specific design optimizations. The graphite has large thermal inertia and the helium coolant is single phase, inert, and has no reactivity effects. The core is composed of graphite, has a high heat capacity and structural stability even at high temperatures. The fuel is coated uranium-oxycarbide which permits high burn-up (approaching 200 GWd/t) and retains fission products. The high average core-exit temperature of the VHTR (1,000 °C) permits emissions-free production of high grade process heat.  Reactor is designed for 60 years of service.

See also

 
 
 List of nuclear reactors
 
 Nuclear reactor physics
 
 Time-dependent neutronics and temperatures

References

External links
Idaho National Lab VHTR Fact Sheet
 (from the year 2002)
Generation IV International Forum VHTR website

Pebble Bed Advanced High Temperature Reactor (PB-AHTR)
 IAEA HTGR Knowledge Base
 ORNL NGNP page
 INL Thermal-Hydraulic Analyses of the LS-VHTR
 IFNEC slides from 2014 about Areva's SC-HTGR: 
 The Office of Nuclear Energy reports to the IAEA in April 2014: 

Nuclear power reactor types
Graphite moderated reactors